Shapeshifters is a board game that was published by Fat Messiah Games in 1991.

Gameplay
Shapeshifters is a board game about a duel involving two magicians who are both adept at changing form.

Reception
Scott Haring reviewed Shapeshifters in Pyramid Number 5 (Jan., 1994), and stated that "Overall, this is an inventive game that is easy to learn (but by no means easy to master) and takes less than an hour to play. The components are simple (but not too cheap), and [...] the game is a bargain. What more could you ask for?"

References

Board games introduced in 1991